Mathias Eriksen Ranmark (born 16 October 1995) is a Norwegian footballer who plays as a goalkeeper for Moss.

Career
Ranmark began his senior career in Oppsal in 2013. On 30 June 2017, he signed for Eliteserien club Molde. Ranmark got his Molde debut on 12 August 2017, when, following an injury on first-choice Andreas Linde, he came on as a 62nd minute substitute in an Eliteserien game against Rosenborg. Molde were leading the game 1–0, but eventually lost 2–1 after a mistake from Ranmark on the equalising goal.

In the 2019 season, Ranmark was loaned out to Mjøndalen.

On 6 February 2020, Ranmark was loaned out to 1. divisjon club HamKam.

Career statistics

Club

References

External links

1995 births
Living people
Association football goalkeepers
Norwegian footballers
Oppsal IF players
Molde FK players
Mjøndalen IF players
Hamarkameratene players
Moss FK players
Eliteserien players
Norwegian First Division players
Norwegian Second Division players
Norwegian Third Division players